Vladislav Dmitriyevich Sezganov or Sesganov (born 3 July 1988) is a Russian former competitive figure skater. He is the 2012 Golden Spin of Zagreb and 2011 Gardena Spring Trophy champion.

Sesganov is the first European skater to have landed a quadruple lutz jump in a sanctioned competition. He has also practiced quad lutz - triple toe loop combination.

On August 6, 2014, Sesganov announced his retirement from competitive figure skating.

Competitive highlights

References

External links 
 

1988 births
Russian male single skaters
Living people
Sportspeople from Samara, Russia